Moving Portrait is the ninth album by the trumpeter Dave Douglas. It was released on the Japanese DIW label in 1997 and contains performances by Douglas, Bill Carrothers, James Genus and Billy Hart. It includes Douglas' interpretations of three compositions by Joni Mitchell.

Reception
On All About Jazz, Jim Santella stated: "Like all forms of art, the result is a session that includes drama, variety, and a story that attaches different meanings to each viewer or listener. Douglas' music evolves from the hard bop idiom, with special care given to the presentation of his unique ideas. The trumpeter uses a soft attack, round tone, fluid articulation, and unlimited imagination to honor beauty in various forms. ...Recommended".

Track listing
All compositions by Dave Douglas except as indicated
 "The Nine Cloud Dream" – 5:17
 "Paradox" – 7:27
 "Moving Portrait" – 10:05
 "First Frost" – 6:30
 "Roses Blue" (Mitchell) – 2:52
 "My Old Man" (Mitchell) – 7:40
 "The Same Situation" (Mitchell) – 6:00
 "Movement" – 8:09
 "Romero" – 10:36
Recorded at Avatar, New York City on December 29 and 30, 1997

Personnel
Dave Douglas: trumpet
Bill Carrothers: piano
James Genus: bass
Billy Hart: drums

References 

1998 albums
Dave Douglas (trumpeter) albums
DIW Records albums